Robert E. Kenna, S.J. (1844–1912) was appointed Santa Clara University's 9th and 12th president  after the presidency of John Pinasco and Joseph W. Riordan. He was first a student, then professor, then president from 1888 to 1893 and again from 1899 to 1905.

References

Gerald McKevitt, S.J. The University of Santa Clara: A History, 1851-1977 (Page 331)
http://www.thesantaclara.com/2.14532/stories-behind-buildings-benefactors-revealed-1.1868373

1844 births
1912 deaths
19th-century American Jesuits
Presidents of Santa Clara University
Presidents of the University of San Francisco